Nils Fjästad (26 February 1890 – 13 July 1964) was a Swedish athlete. He competed in the men's pentathlon at the 1912 Summer Olympics.

References

External links
 

1890 births
1964 deaths
Athletes (track and field) at the 1912 Summer Olympics
Swedish pentathletes
Olympic athletes of Sweden
Athletes from Stockholm